Agdz, also spelled Agdez is a Moroccan town in the Drâa-Tafilalet region, in the Atlas Mountains with a population of about 10,000. Agdz lies at the feet of Djebel Kissane and along the shores of the Draa River.

Geography
Agdz is located about 65 kilometers south of Ouarzazate, 92 kilometers north of Zagora. Agdz, which means "resting place," is located along the old caravan route linking Marrakech to Timbuktu, and played an important role in the exchange of goods across the Sahara.

In geographic terms, the most predominant feature of Agdz is Jebel Kissane which is in the middle of the Draa Valley to the east of Agdz. Kissane means "glasses" in Arabic and the jebel is so named because it looks like glasses of tea behind a tea pot.

History
The years of 1970 and 1980 were hard on the agricultural sector due to droughts.

Local institutions
The weekly outdoor market (souk) is held on Thursdays across the bridge from the city center.

Dar Chebab (Youth Center) Mohamed Ezzarktouni is the main youth center in Agdz operated by the Moroccan Ministry of Youth and Sports.  Along with a variety of clubs and organizations, the Agdz Media Club was started in December 2012.

There are many associations in Agdz that perform a wide range of civic duties.  The Agdz Association for the Development and Protection of the Environment was founded on May 29, 1999, and includes The University Students Club which is made up of students from the Agdz area who are currently studying at universities in Morocco such as Marrakech, Agadir, and Ouarzazate.  The University Students Club organized a Book Fair and Cultural Celebration from January 29 to February 1, 2013, which was held at Dar Chebab Mohamed Ezzarktouni.

Agdz has two football (soccer) clubs.

Features

External links 

 Lexicorient

Populated places in Zagora Province